Pallavaram Corporation was a corporation planned by the government of the Indian state of Tamil Nadu. In 2011, Chennai Corporation extended its city limits. In 2017, Pallavaram, Avadi and Tambaram was announced for the upgrade into corporations. But later in year 2019, Avadi is upgraded as municipal corporation, while Pallavaram remained as a municipality, and a part of the newly created Chengalpattu district. The proposed Chennai Pallavaram Corporation would have been a satellite corporation adjacent to the Greater Chennai Corporation.

Pallavaram Corporation was expected to include merger of following local bodies:

 Pallavaram Municipality
 Pammal Municipality
 Anakaputhur Municipality
 Thiruneermalai Town Panchayat
 Pozhichalur Village
 Cowl Bazaar Village
 Tirusulam Village
 Moovarasampattu Village
 Kovilambakkam Village

Residents in Pallavaram Assembly Constituency wanted Pallavaram and other surrounding areas to be merged with the Greater Chennai Corporation, making Pallavaram a new zone. Underground Sewerage System was announced for Pammal and Anakaputhur Municipalities. The documents also confirmed that Pammal and Anakaputhur will be merged with Greater Chennai Corporation. Residents expected Pallavaram to be upgraded as independent municipal corporation or merge with Greater Chennai Corporation by merging with Pammal and Anakaputhur Municipalities and other villages. 

In 2021, Pallavaram, Pammal and Tambaram were fused into a single Tambaram Corporation, bringing the proposal to an end.

References

External links 
 
 
 
 
Sriperumbudur: Heavyweight takes on newbie; infrastructure in focus

Government of Chennai
Greater Chennai Corporation
Chennai
Municipal corporations in Tamil Nadu